Gilgul (also Gilgul neshamot or Gilgulei HaNeshamot; Heb. , Plural:  Gilgulim) is a concept of reincarnation or "transmigration of souls" in Kabbalistic esoteric mysticism. In Hebrew, the word gilgul means "cycle" or "wheel"  and neshamot is the plural for "souls." Souls are seen to cycle through lives or incarnations, being attached to different human bodies over time. Which body they associate with depends on their particular task in the physical world, spiritual levels of the bodies of predecessors and so on. The concept relates to the wider processes of history in Kabbalah, involving cosmic Tikkun (Messianic rectification), and the historical dynamic of ascending Lights and descending Vessels from generation to generation.

The esoteric explanations of gilgul were articulated in Jewish mysticism by Isaac Luria in the 16th century, as part of the metaphysical purpose of Creation.

History in Jewish thought
Belief in reincarnation among Jewish mystics first existed in the Ancient World, among differing explanations given of the afterlife, although with a universal belief in an immortal soul. Today, reincarnation is an esoteric belief within many streams of modern Judaism, but is not an essential tenet of traditional Judaism. It is not mentioned in traditional classical sources such as the Hebrew Bible, the classical rabbinic works (Mishnah and Talmud), or Maimonides' 13 principles of faith. Kabbalah (Jewish mysticism), however, teaches a belief in gilgul, transmigration of souls, and hence the belief is universal in Hasidic Judaism, which regards the Kabbalah as sacred and authoritative.

Among well-known rabbis who rejected the idea of reincarnation are Saadia Gaon, David Kimhi, Hasdai Crescas, Jedaiah ben Abraham Bedersi (early 14th century), Joseph Albo, Abraham ibn Daud and Leon of Modena. Among the Geonim, Hai Gaon argued with Saadia Gaon in favour of gilgulim.

Rabbis who believed in the idea of reincarnation include, from Medieval times: the mystical leaders Nahmanides and Bahya ben Asher; from the 16th-century: Levi ibn Habib, and from the mystical school of Safed, Shlomo Halevi Alkabetz, Isaac Luria, and his exponent Hayyim ben Joseph Vital; and from the 18th-century: the founder of Hasidic Judaism, the Baal Shem Tov, later Hasidic Masters, and the Lithuanian Jewish Orthodox leader and Kabbalist the Vilna Gaon; and - amongst others - from the 19th/20th-century: Yosef Hayyim author of Ben Ish Hai.

With the 16th-century rational systemisation of Cordoveran Kabbalah by Alkabetz, and the subsequent new paradigm of Lurianic Kabbalah by Luria, Kabbalah replaced rationalism as the mainstream traditional Jewish theology, both in scholarly circles and in the popular imagination. Isaac Luria taught new explanations of the process of gilgul and identification of the reincarnations of historic Jewish figures, which were compiled by Hayyim ben Joseph Vital in his Shaar HaGilgulim.

The idea of gilgul became popular in Jewish folk belief, and is found in much Yiddish literature among Ashkenazi Jews.

In Kabbalah

The essential Kabbalistic text in regards to gilgul is called Sha'ar Ha'Gilgulim (The Gate of Reincarnations), based on the work of Rabbi Isaac Luria (and compiled by his disciple, Rabbi Chaim Vital). It describes the deep, complex laws of reincarnation. One concept that arises from Sha'ar Ha'gilgulim is the idea that gilgul is paralleled physically by pregnancy. In Kabbalah, any higher spiritual truth is seen to be reflected in lower forms in this physical World. This is because the Divine lifeforce for this realm first descends through the chain of higher realms.

Expression of divine compassion

In Kabbalistic understanding of gilgul, reincarnation is not fatalistic or automatic, nor is it essentially a punishment of sin, or reward of virtue. In Judaism, the Heavenly realms could fulfill Maimonides' Principle of faith in Reward and Punishment. Rather, it is concerned with the process of individual Tikkun (Rectification) of the soul. In Kabbalistic interpretation, each Jewish soul is reincarnated enough times only in order to fulfill each of the 613 Mitzvot. The souls of the righteous among the Nations may be assisted through gilgulim to fulfil each of their seven mitzvot, the Seven Laws of Noah. As such gilgul is an expression of Divine compassion, and is seen as a Heavenly agreement with the individual soul to descend again. This stress on physical performance and perfection of each Mitzvah, is tied to the Lurianic doctrine of Cosmic Tikkun of Creation. In these new teachings, a Cosmic catastrophe occurred at the beginning of Creation called the "Shattering of the Vessels" of the Sephirot in the "World of Tohu (Chaos)". The vessels of the Sephirot broke and fell down through the spiritual Worlds until they were embedded in our physical realm as "sparks of holiness" (Nitzutzot). The reason in Lurianic Kabbalah that almost all Mitzvot involve physical action, is that through their performance, they elevate each particular Spark of holiness associated with that commandment. Once all the Sparks are redeemed to their spiritual source, the Messianic Era begins. This metaphysical theology gives cosmic significance to the life of each person, as each individual has particular tasks that only they can fulfil. Therefore, gilgulim assist the individual soul in this cosmic plan. This also explains the Kabbalistic reason why the future eschatological Utopia will be in this World, as only in the lowest, Physical realm is the purpose of Creation fulfilled.

Spiritual dimension of all Creations

In Kabbalah, from its initial Medieval form onwards, Creation is described as a descending Chain of spiritual Worlds of cause and effect. The new 16th-century Kabbalistic paradigm of Isaac Luria extends the meaning of this with the concept of the holy sparks. Creation is a continuous process of Divine vitality. All physical and spiritual Creations only continue to exist due to the immanent Divine Ohr ("Light"), from God's Will to create, that they constantly receive. This immanent flow forms the spark of holiness in any Created form. This teaches that the true essence of anything is only its Divine spark within, that gives it continual existence. If the light were to be withdrawn, the creation would cease to exist. This complete dependence on Divinity is hidden in this lowest physical realm, but the souls and angels of successively higher spiritual realms are nullified to the Divine Unity, in successively higher degrees. This explains the statement of Isaac Luria that even stones possess a subtle form of soul. With the focus in Lurianic Kabbalah on Cosmic Tikkun rectification, accordingly every leaf also possesses a soul that "came into this world to receive a rectification".

Above-conscious root of Gilgul
16th-century Lurianic doctrine was the first time that Kabbalah focused on gilgul, because it forms the microcosmic parallel to the Cosmic Divine rectification taught by Luria. In Medieval Kabbalah of the Zohar, which received its full rational synthesis in 16th-century Cordoveran Kabbalah, immediately before the new teachings of Luria, Gilgul was not the focus as intellectual categorisation was sought. Lurianic Kabbalah, accordingly, while also fully systemised in rational articulation, nonetheless focuses on Divine soul levels above intellect. The central doctrine of Luria is the Tzimtzum (Divine "Withdrawal") that paradoxically transcends human logic. The Tikkun rectification of the Tzimtzum, involving the "birur" (elevation) of the sparks of Creation, and their soul parallel of Gilgul, similarly are rooted in Divine levels above intellect. In the foundational Kabbalistic structure of the 10 Sephirot (emanations), Keter (Divine Will) transcends the intellectual Sephirot, and is the origin of All.

The Lurianic idea that all physical and spiritual Creations possess their particular bodily "soul", explains the notion that gilgul can involve a person's soul occasionally being exiled into lower creatures, plants or even stones.

Five levels of the soul

In Jewish mysticism the human soul has five levels that relate to different levels of the Sephirot (Divine emanations). Based on an ancient Midrashic source, Kabbalah (followed also in Hasidic interpretation of Kabbalah) gives names for these five levels. Their corresponding Sephirot have both outer spiritual functions (vessels) and inner dimensions (lights), that relate to outer manifestations of the human soul, and their inner psychological "soul powers". The five levels of the human soul in ascending order:

The most basic component of the soul, the nefesh, is always part of the gilgul process, as it must leave at the cessation of blood production (a stage of death). It moves to another body, where life has begun. There are four other soul components and different nations of the world possess different forms of souls with different purposes.

Other processes of transmigration
Gilgul is contrasted with the other processes in Kabbalah of Ibbur - the attachment of a second soul to an individual, and Dybuk - a malicious possessing spirit believed to be the dislocated soul of a dead person.

In Hasidism

Internalisation of Kabbalistic structures in dveikut

Lurianic Kabbalah focuses on the process of gilgulim, as it forms the microcosmic parallel to macrocosmic rectification of Creation. In the elite circles of Kabbalistic scholars, it becomes beneficial to helping achieve rectification for a person to identify their particular spiritual gilgulim.

18th-century Hasidism sought to democratise and popularise the Jewish mystical tradition, so that the common folk could be invigorated by Judaism's inner dimensions. It sought the internalisation of abstract Kabbalistic metaphysics into personal perception and fervour (dveikus), by relating the structures of Kabbalah to their inner psychological relevance in man. Because gilgul forms part of the elaborate, abstract structure of the processes of redemption in Kabbalah, it was therefore sidelined in Hasidic Judaism. Hasidism believed in the Kabbalah and gilgul as authoritative, but left aside the focus in Jewish worship and meditation on the structures, meditations and metaphysical processes, to look to the inner Godliness within everything. Hasidic panentheism devotes itself to dveikus (attachment) to the Divine Omnipresence. In this inner path, identification of one's past gilgulim becomes external, and a diversion from inner Bittul (self nullification). To identify one's particular spiritual tasks could introduce a refined level of egotism, while acting purely from dveikus to God would be a higher, essential soulful Jewish worship. The Hasidic figure of the tzadik (Hasidic Rebbe), to which the followers would flock, was believed to know the particular past gilgulim of each person who came to them, through their semi-prophetic abilities, and the future destiny of each person. However, in Hasidic thought, they would not directly reveal this information in private consultation, as for the follower to know the tasks would introduce self-centredness, and Divine "help from Above". Through its Divine Service, Hasidism sought to make Divinity revealed "from Below" to fulfil the Ultimate purpose of Creation. Nonetheless, the Tzadik would give assistance and special advice that would both help the follower to achieve their tasks, yet also preserve the full soulfulness "from Below" of the common person's Divine service.

Kabbalistic descent and ascent in history

Ascending stages in the history of Jewish mysticism

In the history of Jewish mysticism, this Hasidic approach to gilgul corresponds to the third of three successive stages of perception and relation to Divinity. This is based on the three ascending categories of existence taught by the Baal Shem Tov: Worlds ("Olamot"-External spiritual vessel forms), Souls ("Neshamot"-Internal spiritual lights), Divinity ("Elokut"-Essential Godliness).

Descent of the Generations in Halachic scholarship

Traditional Judaism views latter generations to be spiritually inferior and lower than former generations. This belief, called Yeridat ha-dorot ("Descent of the generations"), shapes the development of traditional Jewish thought. In Talmudic commentary and Halachah it means that latter authorities in the Eras of Rabbinic Judaism generally do not disagree with authorities from a previous era. The basis of this is two-fold. In the historical chain of transmission of Judaism from generation to generation, a latter generation is further removed from the original Revelation of the Torah on Mount Sinai. The Halachic authorities of a subsequent generation would avoid disagreeing with the preceding Halachic authorities, since to reach them, the chain of Torah transmission is longer and more vulnerable to mistaken recollection. This applies until the Oral Torah was written down in the Talmud, where the Amoraim Sages of the Gemara commentary do not disagree with the earlier Tannaim Sages of the Mishna. Accordingly, the Mishnaic Pirkei Avot begins with a historical account of the chain of Oral Torah transmission from Moses, until it became written down in the Mishna. Once the Oral Torah was written down in the Talmud and its commentaries, the principle still applies for a second reason. While Halachah adapts itself to new technological innovations, the principles behind it are held to be foundational. Latter authorities are less qualified to define the fundamental parameters of Halachah.

Lower levels of souls in latter generations

This belief in Descent of the Generations is believed in the world view of Orthodox Judaism, which traditionally based itself around Talmudic scholarship. However, the ascending levels from generation to generation in Jewish mysticism described above, an opposite pattern to the Descent of Generations, are not so well known in contemporary Orthodoxy. This is because Jewish mysticism is less understood by regular Orthodox Jews, especially outside of the mystical Hasidic Movement. Within Hasidism as well, scholarly understanding of the meaning of Hasidic philosophy in relationship to historical Kabbalah, is more restricted to certain Hasidic groups over others. The three ascending stages in Kabbalistic paradigm, listed above, do not contradict the wider belief of Descent of the Generations. Kabbalah gives its own metaphysical reason for the generational descent. In Kabbalistic theology, latter generations possess lower souls than former generations. The level of a soul in Kabbalah only refers to its revealed form, while all the souls are rooted in the same sources. A lower soul means that its spiritual power became greatly constricted as it descended the Chain of Worlds to reach this World. Accordingly, the possessor of the soul has much more limited spiritual capabilities. In the last generations before the Messiah, the souls come from the lowest levels, even though they are gilgulim of higher souls from earlier generations. This gives the Kabbalistic interpretation of the last generations when the "Heels (footsteps) of the Messiah" are perceptible. This Talmudic phrase becomes in Kabbalah, the generations of souls that correspond in the Man-metaphor of the Sephirot to the lowest level of the "heels" of the feet. This need however not be considered a disadvantage, as in Hasidic thought, which sought inner nullification to God in dveikus, lower souls worship God with more self-sacrifice and innermost sincerity, because they act without great knowledge and fulfilment of ego. Their Divine service is able to bring the Messiah because of their devoted essential soulfulness.

Ascending mystical revelations of select Tzadikim

In Jewish mystical thought, the descent of generations applies even more because of this metaphysical explanation. Within scholarship it applies to Halachah and Talmudic commentary because of the simple historical explanations. However, within Lurianic mysticism the opposite progressive ascendency still applies. The reason for this is because this 16th century Kabbalistic dimension of Jewish thought is innovated only by the greatest Tzadikim (saintly souls) in history, the rarest of whom are unaffected by descending generational soul levels. A Tzadik in early 19th century Chabad philosophy, as defined by the Tanya (c. 1814), is a truly elevated soul, unaffected by physical limitations. The rarest such Tzadikim in history, who teach new revelations in Kabbalistic thought, are considered apart from general (traditional) Tzadikim. To them is applied in Kabbalah the verse from Psalms, "The [traditional] Tzadik is the foundation of the World". 16th century Lurianic Kabbalah and 18th century Hasidic philosophy make radical statements about this believed supreme level of Tzadik. In the Kabbalistic worldview, their new revelations in Jewish mystical thought advance the conceptual frontiers of Kabbalah from generation to generation. Therefore, while in Halachah (Jewish Law), scholarship ability decreases in each generation, in 16th century Lurianic, 18th century Hasidic, and 19th century Chabad philosophy, mystical thought is said to ascend through history. This ascent applies to Jewish mystical thought, the "Inner Torah" (Nistar-"Concealed") of Kabbalah, rather than the "Revealed Torah" (Nigleh-"Revealed") of Jewish commentaries on the Bible, Midrash, Talmud, Halachah and Medieval Jewish philosophy. The reason for this is because in Nigleh, scholarship involves discovering new and deeper interpretations of previous revealed Biblical and Rabbinic texts. In Lurianic Kabbalah, advance is made by new doctrines and individual revelations that transcend previous descriptions. "Revealed" Nigleh corresponds to the collaborative scholarly ascent "from Below" of human intellect up to God. "Concealed" Nistar corresponds to privately drawing down new revelations of Divine intellect "from Above", down into the human intellect of one individual. This is also a philosophy, as the difference between Nevuah ("Prophecy") and Kabbalah ("Received"), is that Lurianic Kabbalah becomes articulated conceptually in intellectual structures, in which allegedly lays its supremacy over prophecy.

Ascending lights, descending vessels in history

This paradoxical dialectic is explained more generally in Hasidic thought as part of the divine cosmic plan of Kabbalistic Lights and Vessels. In each subsequent generation, the external levels of creation and this world ("vessels") descend to a lower level. This enables the difference between purity and impurity to become revealed, clarified and redeemed. At the same time, "In every generation a new, higher light descends from on High" to transform this World. This inner revelation ascends progressively to prepare for, and give a foretaste of the Messianic Era. In the future era, the constant, inner elevation of existence, the mystical purpose of creation, will be revealed, as the messianic revelations of divinity are created through the present service of God from below. In kabbalistic terminology this dialectic is also related to the "masculine waters" of "direct light" from above, and the "feminine waters" of "reflected light" from below. This explains the mystical concept in Hasidic interpretation of Kabbalah that in the messianic era, the feminine in creation will become the ascendant, and similarly the body will give life to the soul, the opposite of the present reality.

The ultimate purpose of any spiritual descent in Kabbalah is "only in order to reach a higher spiritual ascent", than the original level at the start. In the Hasidic explanation of individual Divine providence, all that occurs for every individual is a concealed part of this ultimate ascent. In its inner interpretation, the descent, such as a spiritual fall, is itself the concealed beginning of the true divine ascent. According to this Hasidic explanation, sin is an opportunity for mystical dveikus (fervour) in Teshuvah (Return to God). This expression of divine compassion excludes any misinterpretation of Jewish reincarnation as a fatalistic process of reward and punishment.

Identification of Gilgulim of historical figures

Outline of Jewish genealogy of nations
Traditional Judaism describes Abraham as the first Jew. With his son Isaac, and grandson Jacob, they are described as the "Fathers" of the Jewish people, and their wives, Sarah, Rebecca, Rachel and Leah are the "Mothers". These terms take on Kabbalistic meanings by being associated with some of the different Sephirot (Divine emanations). It was Moses, in traditional Judaism, who later received the teachings of Judaism at Mount Sinai, embodied in the Torah and 613 mitzvot. The other "Nations of the World", counted as 70 roots from Noah, are given the Seven Laws of Noah for spiritual redemption, and do not need to convert to Judaism, in Jewish thought, to fulfil the eschatological purpose of Creation, or private salvation.

Associations of particular figures with their reincarnations in Juda

 Rabbi Isaac Luria (1534-1572), also known as the Ari, was a prominent Kabbalist who taught the concept of Gilgul, which means "revolving" or "cycling." According to Luria, souls can be reincarnated into new bodies, and each reincarnation provides an opportunity for the soul to correct past mistakes and complete its spiritual mission. Luria believed that he was a reincarnation of Rabbi Shimon bar Yochai, a Talmudic sage from the 2nd century CE.
 The Baal Shem Tov (1698-1760), the founder of Hasidic Judaism, was believed by his followers to be a reincarnation of the biblical figure Moses. According to one story, the Baal Shem Tov's soul was too pure to be contained in one body, so it was split into two souls, one of which was reincarnated as Rabbi Nachman of Breslov (1772-1810), the founder of the Breslov Hasidic dynasty.
 The Vilna Gaon (1720-1797), a prominent Lithuanian rabbi and Talmudic scholar, was believed by some of his followers to be a reincarnation of the biblical figure Elijah the prophet. According to legend, Elijah visited the Vilna Gaon in a dream and told him that he was indeed his reincarnation.

 Chaim ibn Attar in his classic commentary on the Torah identifies Moses as the gilgul of Abel, and Rabbi Akiva as the gilgul of Cain.

 The Hasidic Rebbe, Moshe Teitelbaum of Ujhel (1759–1841), who was one of the founders of Hasidism in Hungary, told his followers that he had been reincarnated three times, which he recalled. His first gilgul was as a sheep in the flock of the Biblical Patriarch Jacob. He sang to his followers the song, he said, that Jacob sang in the pastures. His second gilgul was in the time of Moses, and his third gilgul, which he did not disclose out of humility, was in the time of the destruction of the First Temple in Jerusalem. His followers asked another Hasidic Rebbe, who identified the third gilgul as the Biblical Prophet Jeremiah. In Hasidic history, his daily life especially reflected a yearning for the building of the Third Temple with the arrival of the Messiah. In his later days he wore his Shabbat clothing the entire week, anticipating the Messiah's arrival.
 The contemporary scholar of Kabbalah and Hasidut, Yitzchak Ginsburgh, identifies Isaac Newton as the modern reincarnation of Noah on his website. He uses gematria in this identification, but also describes associations that run deeper. In the commentary of the Zohar on the story of Noah's flood, the Zohar gives a prediction that in the latter part of the 6th millennium in the Hebrew calendar dating system (the secular years 1740–1840), a great increase in "Wisdom (In the flood: water) from Above, and Wisdom (Bilically: water) from Below" will be revealed to prepare for the 7th Messianic millennium. If the generation of Noah had been worthy, their flood would have taken the form of wisdom rather than destructive water. This predicted expansion of Torah wisdom ("from Above") and Secular Wisdom and Science (from "Below") was instead delayed until the 6th millennium. This interpretation ties Newton, the founding forerunner of Modern Science, with Biblical Noah. Additionally, Newton rejected Trinitarian ideas in favour of Old Testament Monotheism, a more complete expression of the Seven Laws of Noah. He devoted his scholarly activity as much to esoteric calculations of Bible Codes and the Third Temple, of which Noah's Ark is seen in Jewish commentary as the spiritual prototype, as much as to Mathematics and Physics. His Newtonian physics defined the mechanistic philosophy of Science until modern Physics broke it, analogous to "Wisdom from Above" superseding "Wisdom from Below". Additionally, the Seven Colours of Newton's prism split light are the Jewish symbol for the Seven Laws of Noah. Yitzchak Ginsburgh uses this Kabbalistic identification to support his articulation of the inner Kabbalistic meaning of the Noahide Laws, which have both outer legislation in Halachah, and inner meaning in Kabbalah. Their inner meaning helps fulfil the eschatological role of each Righteous Noahide in the Jewish Messianic description of Universal Redemption for all Nations of the World.

See also
In Judaism:
 Lurianic Kabbalah
 Ibbur
 Dybbuk
 Shaar HaGilgulim

For comparison with other religions:
 Reincarnation

References

External links
 Jewish view of reincarnation
 Ask the Rabbi - aish.com 
 "Gilgul Neshamot - Reincarnation of Souls", essay on gilgul by Rav Avraham Brandwein
 Sefer Nishmath Hayyim by Menasseh Ben Israel 

Jewish mysticism
Kabbalah
Reincarnation
Kabbalistic words and phrases